2961 Katsurahama - minor planet
Katsurahama - famous beach in Kōchi